Shoalstone Pool is a sea-water swimming pool or lido on Shoalstone Beach, Brixham, Devon.

Description
This pool is the English Riviera's only open air 50m sea-water swimming pool. The pool is used by local families and schools in the area. There are excellent views across Torbay at high tide.

The swimming season is May–September when it has lifeguards on duty from 10am to 6pm. There is no charge for swimming. The pool is managed by Shoalstone Pool Limited and supported by the Friends of Shoalstone Pool.

References

External links
Lidos in the UK
Friends of Shoalstone Pool

Lidos
Brixham
Swimming pools